Door Into Summer is the debut album by Christian rock band Jacob's Trouble. It was released in 1989 and produced by Terry Scott Taylor and engineered by Gene Eugene. It featured a mixture of original numbers and cover versions of songs by The Beatles and The Monkees. AllMusic rated it two out of five stars.

Track listing
Wind and Wave 
Tell Me What You See (Lennon-McCartney (C) Maclen Music)
She Smiles At the Future
Church Of Do What You Want To
Awfully Familiar  (Steve Atwell-Mark Blackburn-Jerry Davison-Terry Scott Taylor)
Waiting For The Son
Door Into Summer (Chip Douglas-Bill Martin (C) Screen Gems-EMI/Tickson Music (BMI))
If You Believe
Million Miles
All For You
Psalm 151

References

1989 albums